Rokometni ženski klub Zagorje or simply RŽK Zagorje is a women's handball club from Zagorje ob Savi, Slovenia. Zagorje has won the Slovenian First League once, in 2016.

Honours
Slovenian Championship
Winners: 2016

European record 
All results list Zagorje's goal tally first.

References

External links
Official website 

Handball clubs established in 1953
Handball clubs established in 2019
Slovenian handball clubs
1953 establishments in Slovenia
2019 establishments in Slovenia
Municipality of Zagorje ob Savi